Tuchowicz  is a village in the administrative district of Gmina Stanin, within Łuków County, Lublin Voivodeship, in eastern Poland.

The village has an approximate population of 450.

Tuchowicz belongs to historic Lesser Poland, and for centuries it was part of Łuków Land, Lublin Voivodeship. The village was first mentioned in 1350 as Tanczcovicz. In 1430, its name was spelled Thuchowicz, and in 1470 - Thuchowyecz. Its name probably comes from Slavic first name Tuchowit. 

On June 26, 1430, King Wladyslaw Jagiello granted Magdeburg rights to the village, allowing for two fairs (July 22 and October 16). Tuchowicz remained a small town, losing its charter probably in the late 18th century. In the 19th century, this former town belonged to the Hempel family, which controlled it until 1945. From 1815 until 1916, Tuchowicz was part of Russian-controlled Congress Poland (see Partitions of Poland).

References

Villages in Łuków County
Lesser Poland
Lublin Voivodeship (1474–1795)
Lublin Governorate
Lublin Voivodeship (1919–1939)